Olen was a legendary early poet from Lycia who went to Delos, where his hymns celebrating the first handmaidens of Apollo in the island of the god's birth and other "ancient hymns" were still part of the cult at Delos in the time of Herodotus:

The hieratic poetry of Olen is now entirely lost. Pausanias wrote, "The Lycian Olen, an earlier poet, who composed for the Delians, among other hymns, one to Eileithyia, styles her 'the clever spinner', clearly identifying her with fate, and makes her older than Cronos." (Description of Greece 8.21.3). Apparently Olen's hymn reflected the pre-Hellenic role of Eileithyia, whom Olympian mythographers like Hesiod recast as a daughter of Zeus and Hera.

The Delphian Pythia Boeo attributed to him the introduction of the cult of Apollo and the invention of the epic meter. Many hymns, nomes (simple songs to accompany the circular dance of the chorus), and oracles, attributed to Olen, were preserved in Delos, revered as Apollo's birthplace. "The legend which was especially attributed to him was that of Apollo's sojourn among the Hyperboreans."

External links

References

Ancient Greek poets
Ancient Delos
Ancient Greek music
Ancient Greek religion
Apollo
Lycians